Extreme Measures is a thriller novel by Vince Flynn.  The novel was a New York Times best seller.  The book is the ninth in a series featuring counter-terrorism agent Mitch Rapp.  In this story, Rapp works with CIA agent Mike Nash to battle a Taliban jihadist.

References

American thriller novels
Novels by Vince Flynn
Atria Publishing Group books
2008 American novels